Mexiclan is the debut, self-titled album of the eponymous group, composed of Sem Vargas and Marco Antonio Muñoz. It was released on January 13, 2004, and that same year the album was charted on Billboard Top Latin Albums chart peaking at number 51.

Track listing

References

2004 debut albums